The 2012 British Rowing Championships were the 41st edition of the National Championships, held from 13–15 July 2012 at the National Water Sports Centre in Holme Pierrepont, Nottingham. They were organised and sanctioned by British Rowing, and are open to British rowers.

Senior

Medal summary

U 23

Medal summary

Junior

Medal summary

References

British Rowing Championships
British Rowing Championships
British Rowing Championships